Joseph Frear (10 November 1846–23 December 1926) was a New Zealand builder and businessman. He was born in Grasby, Lincolnshire, England on 10 November 1846.

References

1846 births
1926 deaths
New Zealand businesspeople
People from West Lindsey District